Steve Seargeant (born 2 January 1951) is an English retired professional footballer who played in England and the United States as a left back.

Career
Born in Liverpool, Seargeant began his career with the youth teams of Everton. Seargeant turned professional in 1968, and made his debut in the 1971–72 season; he made a total of 80 league appearances for Everton between then and 1978. Seargeant later played in the NASL for the Detroit Express and the California Surf.

Personal life
His son Christian Seargeant is also a professional footballer.

References

1951 births
Living people
Oakland University people
English footballers
English expatriate footballers
Everton F.C. players
Detroit Express players
California Surf players
Expatriate soccer players in the United States
English Football League players
North American Soccer League (1968–1984) players
North American Soccer League (1968–1984) indoor players
Association football fullbacks
English expatriate sportspeople in the United States